Fuchigami (written: 渕上) is a Japanese surname. Notable people with the surname include:

, Japanese politician
, Japanese voice actress
, Japanese politician

Japanese-language surnames